Elections to Midlothian Council were held on 1 May 2003, the same day as the other Scottish local government elections and the Scottish Parliament general election. The election was the last one using the 18 single-member wards using the plurality (first past the post) system of election.

Labour retained their dominance of the council, with the Liberal Democrats forming the second largest party on the council.

Election results

Ward results

References

2003 Scottish local elections
2003